Tramping Lake may refer to:

 Rural Municipality of Tramping Lake No. 380, Saskatchewan, Canada
 Tramping Lake, Saskatchewan, Canada; a village in the Rural Municipality of Tramping Lake No. 380
 Tramping Lake (lake), Rural Municipality of Tramping Lake No. 380, Saskatchewan, Canada; a lake, the namesake of Tramping Lake, Saskatchewan.
 Tramping Lake (electoral district), a provincial riding in Saskatchewan, Canada; later renamed to "Wilkie".

See also

 
 Tramping (disambiguation)
 Lake (disambiguation)